Michael Andrew may refer to:

Michael Andrew (singer) (born 1965), American jazz singer, bandleader and actor
Michael Andrew (cyclist) (born 1943), Malaysian Olympic cyclist
Michael Andrew (management consultant) (born 1956), Australian management consultant
Michael Andrew (swimmer) (born 1999), American swimmer

See also
Andrew Michael (disambiguation)
Michael Andrews (disambiguation)